The CPF, or consumption–possibility frontier, is the budget constraint where participants in international trade can consume. Under autarky this constraint is identical to the production–possibility frontier.

See also
Utility–possibility frontier

Economics curves
International trade theory